Alastair William James Morgan  (born 28 May 1958) is the former United Kingdom ambassador to the Democratic People's Republic of Korea.

In his diplomatic career, he served mainly in East Asia especially in China and Japan; namely, First Secretary in Tokyo from 1991 to 1996, Director of Investment in Tokyo from 2002 to 2006, Commercial Counsellor in Beijing from 2007 to 2010, and as Consul-General in Guangzhou from 2010 to 2014. He then served as the British ambassador to North Korea from December 2015 to December 2018, after which he was replaced by Colin Crooks. 

Morgan was appointed a Companion of the Order of St Michael and St George in the New Year Honours for 2019.

References

External links 
 Official Profile by GOV.UK

1958 births
Living people
People educated at Sherborne School
Alumni of Trinity College, Cambridge
Ambassadors of the United Kingdom to North Korea
Consuls-General of the United Kingdom in Guangzhou
People from Camberley
Companions of the Order of St Michael and St George